The 1898 Villanova Wildcats football team represented the Villanova University during the 1898 college football season. The team's captain was John F. Bagley.

Schedule

References

Villanova
Villanova Wildcats football seasons
Villanova Wildcats football